is a Japanese Grand Prix motorcycle racer.

Career statistics

Grand Prix motorcycle racing

By season

Races by year

References

1983 births
Living people
Japanese motorcycle racers
125cc World Championship riders